Ghost of a Rose is the fourth studio album by the folk rock group Blackmore's Night, released June 30, 2003. It features covers of Joan Baez's "Diamonds and Rust", and Jethro Tull's "Rainbow Blues".

Background
Allusive to the alchemical feat of palingenesis by Paracelsus, the phrase "ghost of a rose" also occurs in the penultimate paragraph of the physician-philosopher Thomas Browne's 1658 discourse The Garden of Cyrus which concludes, "...and though in the Bed of Cleopatra, can hardly with any delight raise up the ghost of a Rose".

Track listing

Bonus tracks

Personnel
 Ritchie Blackmore – acoustic guitar, electric guitar, hurdy-gurdy, mandola, tambourine, Renaissance drum
 Candice Night – chant, penny whistle, shawm, vocals, background vocals

 Additional musicians
 Madeline Posner (Lady Madeline) – harmony vocals ("Ghost of a Rose", "Way to Mandalay")
 Nancy Posner (Lady Nancy) – harmony vocals ("Ghost of a Rose", "Way to Mandalay")
 Marnen Laibow-Koser (Lord Marnen of Wolfhurst) – violin, viola
 Robert Curiano (Sir Robert Of Normandie) – bass
 David Baranowski (Bard David Of Larchmont) – background vocals ("All for One")
 Mike Sorrentino – drums, percussion
 Tim Cotov – background vocals ("All for One")

Production
 Sascha Braun – photography
 Michael Keel – photography
 David Owen – photography
 Johanna Pieterman – cover art
 Pat Regan – mixing, producer
 Takaomi Shibayama – design
 Carole Stevens – photography

Charts

Certifications

Covers
 "Way to Mandalay" was recorded by Axel Rudi Pell on his 2014 album Into the Storm.

References

2003 albums
Blackmore's Night albums
SPV/Steamhammer albums